The September Days refers to a period during the Russian Civil War in September 1918 when Armenian inhabitants of Baku were massacred by Enver Pasha's Army of Islam and their local Azeri allies when they captured Baku, the soon-to-be capital of the Azerbaijan Democratic Republic. According to most estimates, approximately 10,000 ethnic Armenians were killed in the violence, although some sources claim the number to be as high as 30,000. The massacre is said by some scholars to have been carried out in retaliation for the earlier March Days, in which Dashnak and Bolshevik forces had massacred Azerbaijani inhabitants of the city in March 1918. It was the last major massacre of World War I.

Background

Since April 1918, the city of Baku had been governed by a Soviet (council) under the leadership of the Bolshevik Stepan Shahumyan. The Baku Sovnarkom or Soviet had been collaborating with the local branch of the Armenian Dashnaktsutiun party to establish control over the city and its surrounding environs but by the beginning of the summer of that year, it found itself under increasing threat by the advancing armies of the Ottoman Empire. The armed forces of the two sides clashed in June and July but the forces loyal to the Baku Soviet were unable to halt the joint Ottoman-Azerbaijani offensive and were forced to retreat. With the Ottomans and Azeris poised to strike Baku and with no promise of material support from Moscow, the Baku Soviet was forced to turn to a British expeditionary force which was stationed in the region under the command of Major General Lionel C. Dunsterville. Although Shahumyan was under orders from Moscow to deny entry to the British, he was overruled by his peers in the Soviet, who formally requested British help in late July. On July 31, Shahumyan and the other Bolshevik members of the Baku Sovnarkom resigned from their posts and control of the city was assumed by the Centro-Caspian Dictatorship.

In August, the Ottoman military, led by the Army of Islam, launched a new assault against the frontline positions, which were primarily manned by Armenians. Despite some initial victories, the Armenians had to retreat. The size of the British expeditionary force had proved ultimately to be too small to make much of an impact in the defense of Baku. In the first week of September, a joint Ottoman-Azerbaijani force composed of 15,000 men advanced without much resistance toward Baku and by September 13, had reached the suburbs of the city; meanwhile, Baku's Muslim population prepared to welcome the entry of the Ottoman army. The remaining Armenian troops were too ill-prepared to halt the advance and Dunsterville refused to retain his force any longer. On September 14 his force evacuated from Baku and sailed to Enzeli, leaving the city virtually defenseless.

Events of September Days
A terrible panic in Baku ensued once the Turks entered the city. The Armenians crowded the harbor in a frantic effort to escape. Regular Ottoman troops were not allowed to enter the city for two days, so that the local irregulars – bashibozuks – would conduct looting and pillaging. Despite this order, regular Ottoman troops participated alongside the irregulars and the Azeris of Baku in the plundering, who then turned their fury against the city's Armenian population. Calls by the German officers attached to the Ottoman command staff to treat the local population with leniency were ignored by the Ottoman commanders. The man in charge of posts and telegraphs in Baku, one of those who negotiated the surrender of the city and vainly tried to prevent the worst excesses, noted:

On September 16, the Ottoman divisions formally entered the city in a victory parade reviewed by Ottoman High Command. Baku would subsequently be proclaimed as the capital of the newly established Azerbaijani Republic.

Estimates of the dead range from 10,000 to 30,000 Armenians. According to a special commission formed by the Armenian National Council (ANC), a total of 8,988 ethnic Armenians were massacred, among which were 5,248 Armenian inhabitants of Baku, 1,500 Armenian refugees from other parts of the Caucasus who were in Baku, and 2,240 Armenians whose corpses were found in the streets but whose identities were never established. According to Hrant Avetisian up to 50,000 of Baku's 70,000–80,000 person Armenian community were killed and deported. According to the Armenian Genocide Museum, Armenians in Baku numbered 88,673 in 1918—29,063 of whom were massacred. Moreover, 9,000 "young" Armenians were sent into forced labour in the Mughan Steppe, however, only 400 returned.

See also
 Battle of Baku
 Shusha pogrom
 Anti-Armenianism
Agulis massacre

References

Russian Civil War
Mass murder in 1918
War crimes in Azerbaijan
Azerbaijan Democratic Republic
History of Baku
Massacres in Azerbaijan
Persecution of Oriental Orthodox Christians
September 1918 events
Azerbaijani war crimes
Massacres in 1918
Massacres of Armenians